The Brussels Independent Film Festival, previously known as the Brussels International Independent Film Festival, or le Festival International du Film Indépendant de Bruxelles, has taken place since 1974. It originally focused on Super 8 films and today is a showcase for many kinds of independent films.

The festival has hosted filmmakers such as Pedro Almodovar, François Ozon, and Nanni Moretti. Its initial incarnation ran for 38 years before funding and resource shortfalls suspended it for a six-year hiatus in 2012, until its revival in 2018.

References

External links

Film festivals in Belgium
Culture in Brussels
Tourist attractions in Brussels
Film festivals established in 1974